South Asian University (SAU) is an international university sponsored by the eight Member States of the South Asian Association for Regional Cooperation (SAARC).The eight countries are: Afghanistan, Bangladesh, Bhutan, India, Maldives, Nepal, Pakistan and Sri Lanka. The university started admitting students in 2010, at a temporary campus at Akbar Bhawan, India.Since February 2023 the University is functioning on its permanent campus at Maidan Garhi in South Delhi, India, next to Indira Gandhi National Open University (IGNOU). 

The first academic session of the university started in August 2010 with two post-graduate academic programmes in Economics and Computer Science. , SAU offered Master's and MPhil/PhD programs in Applied Mathematics, Biotechnology, Computer Science, Economics, International Relations, Legal Studies and Sociology. The degrees of the university are recognized by all the member nations of the SAARC according to an inter-governmental agreement signed by the foreign ministers of the eight SAARC member states.

South Asian University attracts students predominantly from all the eight SAARC countries, although students from other continents also attend. There is a country quota system for admission of students. Each year SAU conducts admission tests at various centers in the eight countries.

History
At the 13th SAARC Summit held in Dhaka, in November 2005, Indian prime minister Manmohan Singh proposed the establishment of a South Asian University to provide world-class facilities and professional faculty to students and researchers from SAARC member countries. The "Inter-governmental Agreement for the Establishment of the South Asian University" was signed at the 14th SAARC Summit. The SAARC member states also decided that the university would be established in India. Professor G.K. Chadha, member of Prime Minister's Economic Advisory Council and former vice chancellor of Jawaharlal Nehru University, was formally appointed the CEO of the project and first President.

As of 2018 Pakistan has cleared most of its dues payable.

SAU Logo
The logo of South Asian University represents the eight nations of SAARC. The basic form of the logo is octagonal, each side representing a country. The octagon, when used in the perspective of design turns into the numerical "8" that also represents infinity (∞ ) in a purely visual sense. The numerical"8" or the infinity symbol is then overlaid upon itself to present an evolving motif form that is present in varying contexts and interpretations in all of South Asia.

Proposed campus
The proposed campus of South Asian University is coming up at Maidan Garhi, adjacent to IGNOU and Asola Wildlife Sanctuary. The Master Layout Plan of this 100 acre campus has been prepared and almost all statutory approvals / clearances have been obtained. The campus will house faculty buildings, hostels, playgrounds, residential apartments and a club among others. The construction was expected to be completed by 2020.

Organisation and administration
The founding President of the university, G. K. Chadha, died on 1 March 2014. On 3 November 2014, Dr. Kavita Sharma took charge as the President of the university. She retired in November 2019. A.V.S. Ramesh Chandra was appointed as acting President. He was followed by Ranjan Kumar Mohanty who is the current acting President.

The decision-making bodies of South Asian University comprise the Governing Board, the Executive Council, the Academic Council, and the Finance Committee.

Academics

Academic objectives
The mandate of the South Asian University, as set out in the Agreement of the SAARC member states under which the university is set up envisages that the choice of the programs of studies to be offered at this University should:
 enhance learning in the South Asian community that promotes an understanding of one another's perspectives and strengthen regional consciousness;
 provide liberal and humane education to the brightest and the most dedicated students of South Asia so that a new class of quality leadership is nurtured; and
 enhance capacity building of the South Asian Nations in science, technology and other areas of higher learning vital for improving their quality of life such as information technology, biotechnology and management sciences, etc.

Programmes offered
Being a research-focused university, SAU currently offers research and postgraduate programmes. At present the university offers full-time research and master's programme in the following areas:
 Applied Mathematics
 Biotechnology
 Computer Science
 Development Economics
 International Relations
 Legal Studies
 Sociology

A Faculty of Undergraduate Studies, headed by a Dean, is planned for a later stage. It would conduct a 4-year BA / BS program in Humanities, Social Sciences, and Natural sciences.

Research strategy  
Besides graduate schools and the undergraduate college, the SAU aims at promoting research among the faculty and research scholars. The plan is to have interdisciplinary research centres (IRCs) to carry out research in areas of common interest to SAARC countries. An Institute of South Asian Studies is planned as a flagship research program.

Prof. G. K. Chadha Library

The Prof. G. K. Chadha Library was established to fulfil academic and research need of the students and the staff of the South Asian University. The main library spreads over a total area of 4500 sq. ft. The library has a collection of books, journals, CD/DVD, films etc. covering different subject areas. Electronic resources are accessible to users through EZproxy from anywhere in the world. TAs a core member of the University Grants Commission of India the library has access to e-resources i.e. Oxford University Press, Springer, Taylor & Francis, MathSciNet, ISID, World eBook Library, South Asia Archive and J-Gate. The library also subscribes the PressReader newspaper and magazine database.

Accreditation and recognition
The degrees of South Asian University are recognised by the member states of SAARC, according to an agreement signed by the foreign ministers of the 8 SAARC countries at the time of establishment of the university.

Article 7 of the Agreement reads:
This Agreement shall facilitate the mutual recognition of degrees and certificates awarded by the University in all SAARC Member States at par with the degrees and certificates issued by their respective national universities/institutions.

Student life

Joint celebration of Independence Days of India and Pakistan

Every year the students of South Asian University in general and those from India and Pakistan in particular organize celebrations of the Independence Days of India and Pakistan  together. Pakistan's Independence Day falls on 14 August, and India's on 15 August; celebrations are held on the night of 14 August.

Protests
In 2022, SAU came under serious scrutiny and the administration was severely criticised for not helping the students, increasingly reducing their stipend and arbitrarily suspending students on account of peaceful protests.

References

External links
 

Universities and colleges in Delhi
Manmohan Singh administration
Central universities in India
Universities in Delhi
Educational institutions established in 2010
2010 establishments in Delhi